The 12365 / 12366 Patna Junction–Ranchi Jan Shatabdi Express is a Superfast Express train of the Jan Shatabdi Express series belonging to Indian Railways – East Central Railway zone that runs between  and  Junction in India.

It operates as train number 12365 from Patna Junction to Ranchi Junction and as train number 12366 in the reverse direction, serving the states of Bihar and Jharkhand.

It is part of the Jan Shatabdi Express series launched by the former railway minister of India, Mr. Nitish Kumar in the 2002 / 03 Railway Budget  .

Coaches

The 12365 / 66 Patna-Ranchi Jan Shatabdi Express has 3 AC Chair Car, 16 Second Class seating , 1  Power Car coach and 1 LSLRD . It does not carry a pantry car .

As is customary with most train services in India, coach composition may be amended at the discretion of Indian Railways depending on demand.

Service

As the average speed of the train is above , as per Indian Railways rules, its fare includes a Superfast surcharge.

Routeing

Traction

As the entire route is fully electrified, it is regularly hauled by a Gomoh or Howrah-based WAP-7 locomotive on its entire journey.

Operation

12365 Patna Junction–Ranchi Junction Jan Shatabdi Express runs from Patna Junction on a daily basis arriving Ranchi Junction the same day .
12366 Ranchi Junction–Patna Junction Jan Shatabdi Express runs from Ranchi Junction on a daily basis arriving Patna Junction the same day .

Rake sharing

The 12365 / 66 Patna Junction–Ranchi Junction Jan Shatabdi Express shares its rake with 12023 / 24 Patna–Howrah Jan Shatabdi Express .

References 

 http://pib.nic.in/archive/railbudget/railbgt2002-03/railbgtsp1.html
 https://web.archive.org/web/20160126012037/http://www.indianrail.gov.in/jan_shatabdi.html
 http://timesofindia.indiatimes.com/city/patna/Rail-users-blame-police-for-Ranchi-Patna-Janshatabdi-loot/articleshow/37661345.cms

External links

Transport in Patna
Transport in Ranchi
Rail transport in Bihar
Rail transport in Jharkhand
Jan Shatabdi Express trains